The Wanggung Sumunjang or Sumungun for short is a royal guard unit of the Joseon Dynasty, whose primary duty is to guard the walls and gates of the Five palaces of Seoul.

Equipment

The guards wore royal uniforms, carried traditional weapons, and played traditional instruments. The Sumunjang and Sujongjang wore and plate and mail armor (gyeongbeongap) and the Gapsa wore dudumiggap, a ceremonial armor that does not provide protection in battle.

Ranks
The following list is the Sumungun ranks with their roles and duties:
Sumunjang (수문장): Chief gatekeeper guards the palace gates and commands the Sumungun.
Sujongjang (수정장): Deputy gatekeeper serves as the Daejonggo, manager of the bells and drums
Jongsagwan (종사관): Lieutenant gatekeeper who assists the Chief gatekeeper and manages the gate book
Gapsa (갑사): Armed guard
Jeongbyeong (정병): Regular guard and private soldier of Joseon’s central army
Daejol (대졸): Subordinate soldier and sentry
Jeollugun (전루군): Timekeeper
Chwita (취타): Military band musician

Gallery

Re-enactment
Guard ceremonies have been reenacted since 1996, and are a major tourist attraction.

See also
Naegeumwi
Joseon Army

References

Joseon dynasty
History of Korea
Seoul